Nymphaea lotus, the white Egyptian lotus, tiger lotus, white lotus or Egyptian water-lily, is a flowering plant of the family Nymphaeaceae.

Distribution
It grows in various parts of East Africa and Southeast Asia.  The Nymphaea lotus var. thermalis is a Tertiary relict variety endemic to the thermal waters of Europe, for example the Peţa River in Romania or the Hévíz lake in Hungary .

Cultivation
It was introduced into Western cultivation in 1802 by Loddiges Nursery. Eduard Ortgies crossed Nymphaea lotus (N. dentata) with Nymphaea pubescens (N. rubra) to produce the first Nymphaea hybrid, illustrated in Flore des serres 8 t. 775, 776 under the name Nymphaea ortgiesiano-rubra. It is a popular ornamental aquatic plant in Venezuela.

Description

This species of water lily has lily pads which float on the water and blossoms which rise above the water.

It is a perennial, growing to 45 cm in height. The flower is white, sometimes tinged with pink.

Ecology

It is found in ponds, and prefers clear, warm, still and slightly acidic waters. It can be found in association with other aquatic plant species such as Utricularia stellaris.

Nymphaea lotus has exceptional ability to persist through a dry season with rhizomes. It possesses ability to reduce evaporation by up to 18 percent on most of the days during the summer period.

Uses

As an aquarium plant
Nymphaea lotus is often used as a freshwater aquarium plant. In ornamental garden pools and in greenhouse culture it is grown for its flowers, which do not normally appear under aquarium conditions: aquarists prefer to trim the floating lily pads and just maintain the underwater foliage. Strong light is required for deep reddish color in the "red" forms.

The tiger-like variegations appear under intense illumination.

As a symbol
In ancient times the Egyptian lotus was worshipped, especially in Egypt. It was considered a symbol of creation there. In Ancient Greece, it was a symbol of innocence and modesty.

The Egyptian lotus is the national flower of Egypt.

Claire Waight Keller included the flower to represent Malawi in Meghan Markle's wedding veil, which included the distinctive flora of each Commonwealth country.

As food
In some parts of Africa the rhizomes and tubers are eaten for the starch they contain either boiled, roasted or ground to a flour after drying. The young fruits are sometimes consumed as a salad. The seeds are turned into a meal.

The tubers or the seeds are used as a famine food in India.

The white lotus in Ancient Egypt

The ancient Egyptians cultivated the white lotus in ponds and marshes.

This flower often appears in ancient Egyptian decorations. They believed that the lotus flower gave them strength and power; remains of the flower have been found in the burial tomb of Ramesses II. Egyptian tomb paintings from around 1500 BC provide some of the earliest physical evidence of ornamental horticulture and landscape design; they depict lotus ponds surrounded by symmetrical rows of acacias and palms. In Egyptian mythology Horus was occasionally shown in art as a naked boy with a finger in his mouth sitting on a lotus with his mother. The lotus was one of the two earliest Egyptian capitals motifs, the topmost members of a column. At that time, the motifs of importance are those based on the lotus and papyrus plants respectively, and these, with the palm tree capital, were the chief types employed by the Egyptians, until under the Ptolemies in the 3rd to 1st centuries BC, various other river plants were also employed, and the conventional lotus capital went through various modifications. Women often wore amulets during childbirth that depicted Heqet as a frog, sitting in a lotus.

The number 1,000 in ancient Egyptian numerals is represented by the symbol of the white lotus. The related hieroglyph is: M12

The ancient Egyptians also extracted perfume from this flower. They also used the white lotus in funerary garlands, temple offerings and female adornment.

The white lotus is a candidate for the plant eaten by the Lotophagi of Homer's Odyssey.

Health effects 
Though the plant contains a quinolizidine alkaloid, nupharin, and related chemicals, either described according to sources as poisonous, intoxicating or without effects, it seems to have been consumed since antiquity. The effects of the alkaloids could be those of a psychedelic aphrodisiac, though these effects are more those encountered in Nymphaea caerulea, the blue Egyptian water lily.

Chemistry 
The chloroform, ethyl acetate and n-butanol extracts of the leaf shows the presence of phenolic compounds (flavonoids, coumarins and tannins), sterols and alkaloids.

Other compounds include myricitrin, myricetin 3-(6-p-coumaroylglucoside)|myricetin-3-(6′′-p''-coumaroylglucoside), myricetin-3′-O-(6′′-p-coumaroyl)glucoside and two epimeric macrocyclic derivatives, nympholide A and B, myricetin-3-O-rhamnoside and penta-O-galloyl-β-D-glucose.

References

External links

lotus
Flora of Africa
Plants described in 1753
Taxa named by Carl Linnaeus